Mollisina is a genus of fungi within the Hyaloscyphaceae family. The genus contains 11 species.

References

External links
Mollisina at Index Fungorum

Hyaloscyphaceae